The 2022 SWAC men's basketball tournament was the postseason men's basketball tournament for the 2021–22 season in the Southwestern Athletic Conference (SWAC). The tournament was held March 9–12, 2022. The tournament winner, the Texas Southern Tigers, received the conference's automatic invitation to the 2022 NCAA Division I men's basketball tournament. The tournament was sponsored by Cricket Wireless.

Seeds 
Teams will be seeded by record within the conference, with a tie–breaker system to seed teams with identical conference records. Only the top eight teams in the conference will qualify for the tournament.

Schedule

Bracket

References 

Tournament
SWAC men's basketball tournament
Basketball competitions in Birmingham, Alabama
College sports tournaments in Alabama
SWAC men's basketball tournament
SWAC men's basketball tournament